The United States Classic Racing Association (USCRA) is an organization that organizes and promotes vintage motorcycle racing events, primarily road racing. The USCRA typically runs four racing events per year of one to three days each. Most road racing events are held at the New Hampshire Motor Speedway in Loudon, New Hampshire. Since 2014 a race has been held in September at the New Jersey Motorsports Park in Millville, NJ.

There also two Motogiro events, Moto Giro East in the spring and Motogiro USA in the fall.

Another annual event is the Pewter Run, a road ride for antique motorcycles manufactured between 1900 and 1950.

External links
USCRA
MotoGiro

Motorcycle racing organizations
Motorcycle racing in the United States